East Bourke Boroughs was an electoral district of the Legislative Assembly in the Australian state of Victoria from 1859 to 1904.

The district was defined in the Electoral Districts Act of 1858 as:

Members for East Bourke Boroughs
One member originally, two from 1889.

References

Former electoral districts of Victoria (Australia)
1859 establishments in Australia
1904 disestablishments in Australia